This is a summary of 1916 in music in the United Kingdom.

Events
28 March – Sir Hubert Parry's choral setting of William Blake's poem "And did those feet in ancient time" (which becomes known as "Jerusalem"), is premièred at the Queen's Hall, London, having been written on 10 March.
Gustav Holst completes composition of his orchestral suite The Planets, Op. 32.

Popular music
Harry Castling & Harry Carlton – "The Tanks That Broke the Ranks Out in Picardy" 
A. J. Mills, Fred Godfrey & Bennett Scott – "Take Me Back to Dear Old Blighty"  
Ivor Novello and Lena Guilbert Ford – "Keep the Home Fires Burning" 
Frederick Weatherly & Haydn Wood – "Roses of Picardy"

Classical music: new works
Kenneth J. Alford – The Great Little Army, march
Frederick Delius – Cello Sonata
Gustav Holst – The Planets
John Ireland – Two Songs, 1916

Opera
Rutland Boughton – The Round Table

Musical theatre
13 May – The Happy Day by Seymour Hicks, with music by Sidney Jones and Paul Rubens, and lyrics by Adrian Ross, opens at Daly's Theatre, starring Winifred Barnes, José Collins and Arthur Wontner, where it runs for 241 performances.
3 August – The musical comedy Chu Chin Chow, written, produced, directed and starring Oscar Asche, with music by Frederic Norton, premières at His Majesty's Theatre in London's West End, starring Asche himself, Frank Cochrane and Courtice Pounds. It will run for five years and a total of 2,238 performances (twice as many as any previous musical), a record that will stand for nearly forty years.

Births
8 February – Jimmy Skidmore, jazz musician (died 1998)
13 February – John Reed, actor and opera singer (died 2010)
3 March – Bernard Stevens, composer (died 1983)
17 March – Ray Ellington (born Harry Brown), singer (died 1985)
14 April – Denis ApIvor, composer (died 2004)
9 May – Bernard Rose, organist and composer (died 1996)
9 July – Edward Heath, Prime Minister of the United Kingdom, organist and conductor (died 2005)
11 July – Reg Varney, actor and pianist (died 2008)
11 August – Benny Lee, comedy actor and singer (died 1995)
18 August – Moura Lympany (born Mary Johnstone), pianist (died 2005)
date unknown – Malcolm MacDonald, composer (died 1992)

Deaths
21 January – George Musgrove, theatre and opera producer, 62
13 May – Jessie MacLachlan, Gaelic singer, 50
2 August – Hamish MacCunn, composer, 48 (throat cancer)
5 August – George Butterworth, composer, 31 (killed in action)
13 November – Frederick Septimus Kelly, composer and Olympic rower, 35 (killed in action)
24 November – John Francis Barnett, composer and music teacher, 79

See also
 1916 in the United Kingdom

References

British Music, 1916 in
Music
British music by year
1910s in British music